The green iguana (Iguana iguana), also known as the American iguana or the common green iguana, is a large, arboreal, mostly herbivorous species of lizard of the genus Iguana.  Usually, this animal is simply called the iguana. The green iguana ranges over a large geographic area; it is native from southern Brazil and Paraguay as far north as Mexico.

A herbivore, it has adapted significantly with regard to locomotion and osmoregulation as a result of its diet.

Commonly found in captivity as a pet due to its calm disposition and bright colors, it can be very demanding to care for properly. Space requirements and the need for special lighting and heat can prove challenging to the hobbyist.

Taxonomy
The species was first officially described by Swedish botanist Carl Linnaeus in 1758. Since then, numerous subspecies have been identified, but later classified as merely regional variants of the same species.

Using nuclear and mitochondrial DNA-sequence data to explore the phylogenic history of the green iguana, scientists from El Salvador, Mexico, and the United States studied animals collected from 17 countries. The topology of phylogeny indicated that the species originated in South America and eventually radiated through Central America and the Caribbean. The study revealed no unique mitochondrial DNA haplotypes for subspecific status, but did indicate the deep lineage divergence between Central and South American populations.

Naturalists once classified the Central American iguanas as a separate subspecies (I. i. rhinolopha), but this classification was later found to be invalid based on mitochondrial DNA, and iguanas with similar nose projections appeared randomly in other populations and interbred freely with those that do not share this trait. Genetic studies in the late 2010s still recovered I. rhinolopha as a distinct species, along with several other cryptic lineages present in I. iguana, and classifying only the South American populations may be the "true" green iguana. Two new insular subspecies (I. i. insularis and I. i. sanctaluciae) endemic to St. Lucia, Saint Vincent and the Grenadines and Grenada were also identified in 2019; a 2020 study also recovered both these subspecies as part of a distinct species, the southern Antillean horned iguana (I. insularis). The study also found the Saban black iguana (I. melanoderma), described in that study, to be the sister group of South American I. iguana, with the clade containing both being sister to that of I. insularis. The Reptile Database disagrees with these conclusions, and groups all of these within the green iguana, with four subspecies: I. i. melanoderma, I. i. insularis, I. i.sanctaluciae, and I. i. iguana.

Etymology 
The word "iguana" is derived from a Spanish form of the Taíno name for the species: iwana. In some Spanish-speaking countries, males of the species are referred to as garrobo or ministro and juveniles are called iguanita or garrobito.

Distribution and habitat

The native range of the green iguana extends from southern Mexico to central Brazil, Paraguay, and Bolivia and the Caribbean; specifically Grenada, Aruba, Curaçao, Bonaire, Trinidad and Tobago, St. Lucia, St. Vincent, Montserrat, Saba and Útila. They have been introduced to Grand Cayman, Puerto Rico, Hispaniola (in the Dominican Republic), Saint Martin (island), Guadeloupe, Martinique, Saint Vincent and the Grenadines, Singapore, Thailand, Taiwan, Texas, Florida, Hawaii, and the U.S. Virgin Islands. Furthermore, green iguanas colonised the island of Anguilla in 1995 after being washed ashore following a hurricane. Though the species is not native to Martinique, a small wild colony of released or escaped green iguanas endures at historic Fort Saint Louis.

Green iguana has been introduced from South America to Puerto Rico and is very common throughout the island, where it is colloquially known as gallina de palo ("bamboo chicken" or "chicken of the tree") and considered an invasive species; in the United States, feral populations also exist in South Florida (including the Florida Keys), Hawaii, the U.S. Virgin Islands and the Rio Grande Valley of Texas. Green iguanas have also successfully colonised the island of Anguilla, arriving on the island in 1995 after rafting across the Caribbean from Guadeloupe, where they were introduced.

The green iguana has become rare in parts of its native range of Central and South America due to hunting of wild iguanas for food, where iguanas have received the sobriquet gallino de palo ("bamboo chicken" or "chicken of the trees"). Overhunting resulted in a partial closure of markets in Nicaragua in 1976, while the government of Panama had taken action by the late 1960s to protect iguanas.

Green iguanas are diurnal, arboreal, and are often found near water. During cold, wet weather, green iguanas prefer to stay on the ground for greater warmth. When swimming, iguanas remain submerged, letting their legs hang limply against their sides. They propel through the water with powerful tail strokes.

While they may often be found in trees, these animals are well-known burrowers. They have been observed burrowing in canals, levees, and dikes and along seawalls in southern Florida. If individuals do not dig their own, they may even use gopher tortoise burrows or usurp those of the Florida burrowing owl.

Description 

The green iguana is a large lizard and is probably the largest species in the iguana family, though a few in the genus Cyclura may match or exceed it in weight. A typical adult male weighs around  while the smaller adult female typically weighs .

Despite their name, green iguanas occur in different colours and types. In southern countries of their range, such as Peru, green iguanas appear bluish in colour, with bold blue markings. On islands such as Bonaire, Curaçao, Aruba, and Grenada, a green iguana's colour may vary from green to lavender, black, and even reddish brown. Green iguanas from the western region of Costa Rica are red, and animals of the northern ranges, such as Mexico, appear orange. Juvenile green iguanas from El Salvador are often bright blue, but  lose this color as they get older.

Adult iguanas found on most of St. Lucia, mainly on the northeastern coast, Louvette, and Grand Anse, have many differences from other green iguana populations. They are light green with predominant black stripes. Instead of the typical orange dewlap, the iguanas of St. Lucia have a black dewlap. When compared to the common green iguana, females lay about half the number of eggs, 25 instead of 50. Scales to the back of their head, near the jawbone, are smaller. Their irises are white or cream, whereas other green iguanas have yellow irises.

Green iguanas possess a row of spines along their backs and tails, which helps to protect them from predators. Their whip-like tails can be used to deliver painful strikes, and like many other lizards, when grabbed by the tail,  iguanas can allow it to break, so they can escape and eventually regenerate a new one. In addition, iguanas have a well-developed dewlap, which helps regulate their body temperature. This dewlap is used in courtships and territorial displays.

Green iguanas have excellent vision, enabling them to detect shapes and motions at long distances. As green iguanas have only a few rod cells, they have poor vision in low-light conditions. At the same time, they have cells called double-cone cells that give them sharp color vision and enable them to see ultraviolet wavelengths. This ability is highly useful when basking so they can ensure they absorb enough sunlight to produce vitamin D.

Green iguanas have a white photosensory organ on the top of their heads called the parietal eye (also called the third eye, pineal eye, or pineal gland), in contrast to most other lizards that have lost this primitive feature. This "eye" has only a rudimentary retina and lens and cannot form images, but is sensitive to changes in light and dark and can detect movement. This helps the iguana detect predators stalking it from above.

Green iguanas have very sharp teeth that are capable of shredding leaves and even human skin. These teeth are shaped like a leaf, broad and flat, with serrations on the edge. The similarity of these teeth to those of one of the first dinosaurs discovered led to the dinosaur being named Iguanodon, meaning "iguana tooth", and the incorrect assumption that it had resembled a gigantic iguana. The teeth are situated on the inner sides of the jawbones, which is why they are hard to see in smaller specimens.

Primarily herbivorous, green iguanas are presented with a special problem for osmoregulation; plant matter contains more potassium and as it has less dense nutritional content, more must be eaten to meet metabolic needs. As green iguanas are not capable of creating liquid urine more concentrated than their bodily fluids, like birds they excrete nitrogenous wastes as urate salts through a salt gland. As a result, green iguanas have developed a lateral nasal gland to supplement renal salt secretion by expelling excess potassium and sodium chlorides.

Green iguanas from Guatemala and southern Mexico (which may belong to the distinct species I. rhinolopha) predominantly have small horns on their snouts between their eyes and their nostrils, whereas others do not.

Ecology

Reproductive biology 
Male green iguanas have highly developed femoral pores on the underside of their thighs, which secrete a scent (females have femoral pores, but they are smaller in comparison to those of the males). In addition, the dorsal spines that run along a green iguana's back are noticeably longer and thicker in males than they are in females, making the animals somewhat sexually dimorphic.

Male green iguanas tend to display more dominant behaviors, such as head bobbing and tail whipping. They also tend to develop a taller dorsal crest than females, as well as taller dorsal spines (or spikes).  Large,  round, very pronounced jowls are generally a male characteristic. Jowls are located under the jaw and are protected by the subtympanic plate, which is a large, green, circular-shaped scale.

Green iguanas are oviparous, with females laying clutches of 20 to 71 eggs once per year during a synchronized nesting period. The female green iguana gives no parental protection after egg laying, apart from defending the nesting burrow during excavation. In Panama, the green iguana has been observed sharing nest sites with American crocodiles, and in Honduras with spectacled caimans.

The hatchlings emerge from the nest after 10–15 weeks of incubation. Once hatched, the young iguanas look similar to the adults in color and shape, resembling adult females more so than males and lacking dorsal spines.

Juveniles stay in familial groups for the first year of their lives. Male green iguanas in these groups often use their own bodies to shield and protect females from predators, and it appears to be the only species of reptile to do this.

Behavior 
When frightened by a predator, green iguanas  attempt to flee, and if near a body of water, dive into it and swim away. If cornered by a threat, the green iguana  extends and displays the dewlap under its neck, stiffens and puffs up its body, hisses, and bobs its head at the aggressor. If the threat persists, the iguana can lash with its tail, bite, and use its claws in defense. The wounded are more inclined to fight than uninjured prey.

Green iguanas use "head bobs" and dewlaps in a variety of ways in social interactions, such as greeting another iguana or to court a possible mate. The frequency and number of head bobs have particular meanings to other iguanas.

Green iguanas are hunted by predatory birds, and their fear of these is exploited as a ploy to catch them in the wild. A hunter imitates the sound of a hawk by whistling or screaming, causing the iguana to freeze and making its capture easier.

Diet 

Green iguanas are primarily herbivores, with captives feeding on leaves such as turnip, mustard, and dandelion greens, flowers, fruit, and growing shoots of upwards of 100 different species of plant. In Panama, one of the green iguana's favorite foods is the wild plum (Spondias mombin).

Although they consume a wide variety of foods if offered, green iguanas are naturally herbivorous and require a precise ratio of minerals (two to one calcium to phosphorus) in their diet. Captive iguanas must have a variety of leafy greens along with fruits and vegetables such as turnip greens, collard greens, butternut squash, acorn squash, mango, and parsnip. Juvenile iguanas often eat feces from adults  to acquire the essential microflora to digest their low-quality and hard-to-process vegetation-only diet.

Some debate exists as to whether captive green iguanas should be fed animal protein. Some evidence shows wild iguanas eating grasshoppers and tree snails, usually as a byproduct of eating plant material. Wild adult green iguanas have been observed eating birds' eggs and chicks. They occasionally eat a small amount of carrion or invertebrates. Zoologists, such as Adam Britton, believe that such a diet containing protein is unhealthy for the animal's digestive system, resulting in severe long-term health damage, including kidney failure and leading to premature death. On the other side of the argument is that green iguanas at the Miami Seaquarium in Key Biscayne, Florida, have been observed eating dead fish, and individuals kept in captivity have been known to eat mice without any ill effects. De Vosjoli writes that captive animals have been known to survive and thrive on eating nothing but whole rodent block, or monkey chow, and one instance of romaine lettuce with vitamin and calcium supplements. When found in unnatural habitats, especially those of high human population, they have also been
known to feed on human garbage and poultry feces. Captive iguanas should not be fed lettuce or meat, and instead receive the vitamins and minerals they need from a purely herbivorous diet.

As an invasive species

Caribbean 
In the aftermath of Hurricane Luis and Hurricane Marilyn in 1995, a raft of uprooted trees carrying 15 or more green iguanas landed on the eastern side of Anguilla – an island where green iguanas had never been recorded before. Examination of the weather patterns and ocean currents indicated that the iguanas had probably spent three weeks at sea before arriving on Anguilla. Evidence of this new colony breeding on the island was found within two years of its arrival.

In February 2012, the government of Puerto Rico proposed that the islands' iguanas, which were said to have a population of 4 million and considered to be a non-native nuisance, be eradicated and sold for meat.

Iguanas have especially established introduced populations on islands in the Lesser Antilles, such as most of the French West Indies, Sint Eustatius, and Dominica.

Fiji 
The green iguana is present as an invasive species on some of the islands of Fiji, where it is known as the American iguana. It poses a threat to the native iguanas through the potential spread of disease and to humans by spreading Salmonella. They were initially brought to Qamea in 2000 by an American who wanted them to eat the numerous insects on the island, although they are primarily herbivorous. They are now on the islands of Laucala, Matagi and Taveuni.

United States 
The green iguana is established on Oahu and Maui, Hawaii, as a feral invasive species, despite strict legislation banning the importation of any reptiles, and in the Rio Grande Valley of Texas. As most reptiles carry Salmonella spp., this is a concern and a reason legislation has been sought to regulate the trade in green iguanas.

Due to a combination of events, the green iguana is considered an invasive species in South Florida, and is found along the east coast, as well as the Gulf Coast, of Florida from Key West to Pinellas County. The original small populations in the Florida Keys were stowaways on ships carrying fruit from South America. Over the years, other iguanas were introduced into the wild, mostly originating through the pet trade. Some escaped and some were intentionally released by their owners; these iguanas survived and then thrived in their new habitat. They commonly hide in the attics of houses and on beaches. They often destroy gardens and landscaping. They seem to be fond of eating a native endangered plant, Cordia globosa, and feeding on nickernut (Caesalpinia) a primary food plant of the endangered Miami blue butterfly (Cyclargus thomasi bethunebakeri); additionally on Marco Island, green iguanas have been observed using the burrows of the Florida burrowing owl (Athene cunicularia floridana), a species of special concern, all of which can make them more of a serious threat to Florida's ecosystem than originally believed. Currently, the damage green iguanas have caused has become significant and expected to increase, but controversy remains on how to deal with the problem.

In January 2008, large numbers of iguanas established in Florida dropped from the trees in which they lived, due to unseasonably cold nights that put them in a state of torpor and caused them to lose their grip on the tree branches. Though no specific numbers were provided by local wildlife officials, local media described the phenomenon as a "frozen iguana shower" in which dozens "littered" local bike paths. Upon the return of daytime warmth, many (but not all) of the iguanas "woke up" and resumed their normal activities. This occurred again in January 2010, January 2018, and December 2020 after prolonged cold fronts once again hit southern Florida.

Other countries 
Iguanas are also present in Ishigaki Island, Singapore, Thailand, and Taiwan.

Captivity 

Green iguanas are by far the most globally traded reptiles, representing 46% of the total reptile trade in the US from 1996 and 2012, with annual imports reaching 1 million in 1996. The American pet trade has put a great demand on the green iguana; 800,000 iguanas were imported into the U.S. in 1995 alone, primarily originating from captive farming operations based in their native countries (Honduras, El Salvador, Colombia, and Panama). However, these animals are demanding to care for properly over their lifetimes, and many die within a few years of acquisition.

Recently, an increase in illegal trading has been identified, and a trade ban for transport within and out from the Lesser Antilles was suggested. 

In some locales (such as New York City and Hawaii), iguanas are considered exotic pets, and ownership is prohibited. Due to the potential impact of an introduced species on Hawaii's ecosystem, the state has strict regulations regarding the import and possession of green iguanas; violators can spend three years in jail and be fined up to $200,000.

Conservation 
The green iguana is listed under Appendix II of the Convention on International Trade in Endangered Species (CITES), meaning that international trade is regulated through the CITES permit system. In addition, the green iguana is listed as Least Concern by the IUCN, with a mention of habitat depletion from development being a possible concern for green iguana populations in the future. Historically, green iguana meat and eggs have been eaten as a source of protein throughout their native range, and are prized for their alleged medicinal and aphrodisiac properties. Efforts to raise green iguanas in the past have been made to raise green iguanas in captivity as a food source in an attempt to encourage more sustainable land use in Panama and Costa Rica.

In 2020, iguana researchers collaborated to create an extended and 'live' database on genetic variation within the green iguana. The intent of the database is primarily to guide population management, hybrid identification, and monitoring of invasions and illegal trade.

Cultural references

The Moche people of ancient Peru worshipped animals and often depicted green iguanas in their art. The green iguana and its relative the black iguana (Ctenosaura similis) have been used as a food source in Central and South America for the past 7,000 years. It is possible that some of the populations in the Caribbean were translocated there from the mainland by various tribes as a food source. In Central and South America, green iguanas are still used as a source of meat and are often referred to as gallina de palo ("bamboo chicken" or "chicken of the tree"), because they are said to taste like chicken.

Gallery

References

External links

 Green Iguana Society
Iguana101
 International Iguana Foundation
 Iguana Care: The Comprehensive Guide for Beginner
 
Iguana Extermination in South Florida
Wildlife Management Strategies leading to proliferation of Green Iguanas

Iguana
Lizards of Central America
Lizards of the Caribbean
Lizards of South America
Reptiles of Brazil
Reptiles of Guyana
Reptiles of Colombia
Reptiles of Costa Rica
Reptiles of Guatemala
Reptiles of Honduras
Reptiles of Mexico
Reptiles of Puerto Rico
Reptiles of the Dominican Republic
Reptiles described in 1758
Taxa named by Carl Linnaeus
Articles containing video clips
Exotic pets
Reptiles as pets
Reptiles of Hawaii